Consul is a village in the Canadian province of Saskatchewan within the Rural Municipality of Reno No. 51 and Census Division No. 4. The historic Red Coat Trail and Highway 21 pass through the village. The village features one of the last existing grain elevators in the region. It is 211 km southwest of the City of Swift Current.

History 
Consul incorporated as a village on June 12, 1917.

Demographics 

Education

Consul School is a Kindergarten to Grade 12 facility serving approximately 70 students in the extreme southwest corner of Saskatchewan. Consul School is a part of the Chinook School Division which includes most of southwest Saskatchewan.

See also

 List of communities in Saskatchewan
 Villages of Saskatchewan

References

Villages in Saskatchewan
Reno No. 51, Saskatchewan
Division No. 4, Saskatchewan